The Women's 200 metres at the 2000 Summer Olympics as part of the athletics programme was held at Stadium Australia on Wednesday 27 September, and Thursday 28 September 2000.

The top four runners in each of the initial seven heats automatically qualified for the second round. The next four fastest runners from across the heats also qualified for the second round, and the top four runners in each of the four second round heats automatically qualified for the semi-final.

The top four runners in each semi-final automatically qualified for the final. There were a total number of 54 participating athletes.

U.S. sprinter Marion Jones was stripped of her gold medal following her 2007 admission of taking performance-enhancing steroids. Medals were reallocated accordingly.

Records
Prior to this competition, the existing world and Olympic records were as follows:

No new world or Olympic records were set for this event.

Medals

Results
All times shown are in seconds.
 Q denotes qualification by place in heat.
 q denotes qualification by overall place.
 DNS denotes did not start.
 DNF denotes did not finish.
 DQ denotes disqualification.
 NR denotes national record.
 OR denotes Olympic record.
 WR denotes world record.
 PB denotes personal best.
 SB denotes season best.

Qualifying heats

Round 1

Overall Results Round 1

Round 2

Overall Results Round 2

Semi-finals

Overall Results Semi-Finals

Final

See also
 1998 Women's European Championships 200 metres (Budapest)
 1999 Women's World Championships 200 metres (Seville)
 2001 Women's World Championships 200 metres (Edmonton)
 2002 Women's European Championships 200 metres (Munich)

References

External links
 Official Report of the 2000 Sydney Summer Olympics
 Results
 http://www.dailymirror.lk/DM_BLOG/Sections/frmNewsDetailView.aspx?ARTID=70213

 
200 metres at the Olympics
2000 in women's athletics
Women's events at the 2000 Summer Olympics